Charles Evans Hughes III (March 14, 1915 – January 7, 1985) was an American architect.  One of his most notable work was the Manufacturers Trust Company Building.

Biography
Hughes was the grandson of Chief Justice of the United States and 1916 Republican presidential nominee Charles Evans Hughes and the son of Charles Evans Hughes Jr., who served as United States Solicitor General, 1929 and 1930 under President Herbert Hoover. Hughes' younger brother Stuart was a renowned historian who was noted for antiwar activities during the Vietnam War. As a young man, Hughes attended Deerfield Academy and Brown University, and later the Harvard Graduate School of Design. In World War II, Hughes served as the gunnery officer on the USS Mullany (DD-528).

Hughes was born in New York City and was a resident of Riverdale, Bronx, New York.

References

Brown University alumni
1915 births
1985 deaths
Military personnel from New York City
People from the Bronx
People from Riverdale, Bronx
Deerfield Academy alumni
Architects from New York City
20th-century American architects
Charles Evans Hughes family